The South Wales Senior League is a former football league in South Wales.  The league consisted of two divisions, named Divisions One and Two. Division One was a feeder to the Welsh Football League Division Three, and therefore sat at levels 5 of the Welsh football pyramid.

The league was dominated by clubs from Cardiff with no fewer than 14 titles going to the city. Bridgend Street won it four times and their success in 2011 saw them move up into the Welsh Football League for the first time.

The league was merged with South Wales Amateur League in 2015–16 season to form South Wales Alliance League.

Member Clubs in the final 2014-15 season

Division 1

AFC Butetown
Brecon Corries
Cornelly United
Cwmaman Institute
Cwmbach Royal Stars
Fochriw
Grange Albion
Max United
Penydarren BGC
Pontlottyn
Porthcawl Town
Sporting Marvels
Sully Sports
Tonyrefail BGC

Division 2

AFC Whitchurch
Cadoxton Barry
Cefn Cribwr
Cogan Coronation
Garw SBGC
Llanrumney United
Margam Youth Centre
Penrhiwceiber Cons Athletic
Penrhiwfer
St Albans
St Josephs
Stanleytown
Tongwynlais
Ynyshir Albions

Divisional Champions

Division One Champions - by number of titles

 Bridgend Street – 4 titles
 Caerau (Ely) – 4 titles
 Sully Sports – 4 titles
 Fairwater – 2 titles
 Grange Quins – 1 title
 AFC Llwydcoed – 1 title
 Bettws – 1 title
 Cwm Welfare – 1 title
 Lisvane – 1 title
 Lisvane Heath Hornets – 1 title
 Penrhiwfer – 1 title
 Pentwyn Dynamos – 1 title
 Pontlottyn – 1 title
 Ynyshir Albions – 1 title

References

5
Sports leagues established in 1991
1991 establishments in Wales
2015 disestablishments in Wales
Defunct football competitions in Wales